Buile Hill Academy is a coeducational secondary school in Pendleton, Salford, England, opposite Buile Hill Park. It is a specialist Visual Arts College.

History
The school is over 100 years old in some parts, with the school owning a playing field with Salford City College in Pendleton, which is across the field to the north. It was known as Salford Grammar School until 1973, when its sixth form along with Pendleton High School for Girls was moved to Pendleton College, which is next door. The building had opened on 12 January 1956, being officially opened on 21 March 1956 by the Mayor of Salford, G. H. Goulden. The school was renamed Buile Hill High School.

The school received an Artsmark Gold Award in May 2006 and was renamed Buile Hill Visual Arts College. It is one of the few schools in the area with a fully working theatre and performance space.

The school's headteacher left the school in the summer of 2006 and was replaced by a 'super head'. The new headteacher, Mr. P. Fitzpatrick, was paid a larger-than-usual salary of £100,000 per year, and was contracted for two years to improve the school's results and ready the school for the move into its new buildings in 2008. However, Fitzpatrick failed to achieve the results that the council had been looking for, and in 2007 he was removed by mutual agreement after just two terms. In 2007 the school's results on the standard measure (% of pupils reaching 5 GCSEs at grades A*-C) jumped from 26% to 52%.

GCSE figure for 2007 rose from 26 per cent of pupils gaining 5 A* to C the previous year, to 52 per cent in 2007. The school's contextual value added now stands at 999; the national average is 1,000.

The school underwent an OFSTED inspection in October 2007 which described the school as satisfactory overall with elements of good.

The school was rebuilt on the adjacent field and completed in 2008. The new buildings were funded through the Private Finance Initiative.

In March 2014, Edward Beetham, a former head of year and humanities teacher at the school, pleaded guilty to indecency with an 11-year-old pupil in the early 1990s. He was spared jail, but was subjected to a two-year community order, with a requirement to attend a sex offenders' programme. His defence barrister, Stuart Duke, told Manchester Crown Court: "He has lost his good character. He has gone from being a genteel, retired schoolteacher playing petanque to somebody who will be monitored by the authorities – it has been absolutely devastating for this to come back and haunt him." When sentencing, Judge Patrick Field QC, told Beetham: "You developed and encouraged a relationship with (the victim) – this appears to me, at least in part, grooming behaviour, enabling you to lure him into your bedroom where you invited an undoubtedly bewildered child to beat you for your own sexual gratification."

Previously a community school administered by Salford City Council, in August 2016 Buile Hill Visual Arts College converted to academy status and was renamed Buile Hill Academy. The school is now sponsored by Consilium Academies.

Notable former pupils

 Wes Butters – TV and radio presenter.
 Gillian Doherty – author and editor of educational books for children, disability rights campaigner, founder of SEND action campaign group.
 Paul Lockitt – radio newsreader, who was named commercial radio's Newsreader of the Year at the Sky/IRN Radio Awards in 2012 for the fifth year having previously won the national award in 2004, 2005, 2006 and 2011
Michael Appleton – former player of Manchester United, Preston North End, West Bromwich Albion and current First Team Coach at Oxford United.
Tom Short – comedian

Salford Grammar School

 John Caine, MBE, FRSA, author ("A Nest of Singing Birds") and playwright ("Mister Lowry", "Reunion", "On the Knocker" )
 Rt Rev Neville Chamberlain, Bishop of Brechin from 1997 to 2005
 Albert Finney is a five times Academy Award-nominated English actor
 Michael Fidler, Conservative MP for Bury and Radcliffe from 1970 to 1974
 David Glencross CBE, Chief executive of the Independent Television Commission from 1991 to 1996
 Prof Norman Haycocks, Professor of Education at the University of Nottingham from 1946 to 1973
 Mark Hendrick is the Labour Co-operative Member of Parliament for Preston since 2000
 Dr David Hessayon OBE, gardener, Chairman of the British Agrochemicals Association from 1980 to 1981
 Peter Hook and Bernard Sumner of Joy Division and New Order
 Dr Ralph Kohn, pharmacist
 Mike Leigh, film director who joined the Royal Shakespeare Company as an assistant director in 1967. He later achieved lasting fame for plays such as Nuts in May and for his films including the Palme d'Or at the Cannes Film Festival and five Academy Award nominations. His latest film (2018) was Peterloo
 Eddie Maguire scriptwriter who wrote "Ray's A Laugh" (with Ted Ray) for the BBC among other successes
 Abraham Moss, Mayor of Manchester from 1953 to 1954, and former President of the YHA
 John Pitt-Brooke CB, Director-General Secretariat at the Ministry of Defence since 2006
 James Porter CBE, Director General of the Commonwealth Institute from 1978 to 1991
 Tom Price, Labour MP for Westhoughton 1951–73
 David Quinn is a British bird artist. He won the 1987 Bird Illustrator of the Year Award of the British Birds magazine
 Harold Riley, artist, born 1934
 John Maurice Shaftesley OBE, journalist
 Ernest Sinnott, Chairman of the South Eastern Electricity Board from 1966 to 1974, and President of the International Project Finance Association (IPFA) from 1956 to 1957
 Capt Richard Spencer, Conservative MP for St Helens from 1931 to 1935
 Prof Leslie Wagner CBE, Vice-Chancellor of Leeds Metropolitan University from 1994 to 2003, and Vice-Chancellor of the University of North London from 1992 to 1993
 Staff Sergeant Jim Wallwork (1919-2013), first Allied soldier on French soil on 6 June 1944, after being catapulted through the windscreen of a Horsa glider, when taking part in the effort to capture the Caen canal and Orne river bridges.
 Ken Wilson, writer EFL (English as a Foreign Language) books, with sales of over 450,000,000 in China. Born 1947

References

External links
 Buile Hill Academy official website
 Old Salfordians Association
 EduBase
 History of Salford Grammar/Technical High School (pdf, at pages 4–5)

1904 establishments in England
1973 establishments in England
Secondary schools in Salford
Educational institutions established in 1904
Educational institutions established in 1973
Academies in Salford
 
Specialist arts colleges in England